In their last season in the American Association, the 1891 Baltimore Orioles finished in fourth place (third among teams that played a full schedule) with a record of 71–64. After the season, the AA folded, and the Orioles joined the National League.

Regular season

Season standings

Record vs. opponents

Roster

Player stats

Batting

Starters by position 
Note: Pos = Position; G = Games played; AB = At bats; H = Hits; Avg. = Batting average; HR = Home runs; RBI = Runs batted in

Other batters 
Note: G = Games played; AB = At bats; H = Hits; Avg. = Batting average; HR = Home runs; RBI = Runs batted in

Pitching

Starting pitchers 
Note: G = Games pitched; IP = Innings pitched; W = Wins; L = Losses; ERA = Earned run average; SO = Strikeouts

Other pitchers 
Note: G = Games pitched; IP = Innings pitched; W = Wins; L = Losses; ERA = Earned run average; SO = Strikeouts

References 
1891 Baltimore Orioles season at Baseball Reference
1891 Baltimore Orioles team page at www.baseball-almanac.com

Baltimore Orioles (1882–1899) seasons
Baltimore Orioles season
Baltimore Orio